Patrick or Pat Morris may refer to:
 Patrick Morris (merchant) (c. 1789–1849), Irish-born merchant, author and politician in Newfoundland
 Patrick Morris (director), British wildlife film and TV producer and director
 Pat Morris (American football) (born 1954), offensive line coach
 Patrick Morris (American football) (born 1995), American football offensive lineman
 Pat Morris (politician) (born 1938), American sports agent, lawyer and mayor of San Bernardino, California 
 Patrick John Morris (1948–2008), British composer, musician and songwriter
 MV Patrick Morris, Canadian train ferry that sank in 1970